Abd al-Mutalib ibn Ghalib ibn Musa‘ad (‎; 179029 January 1886) served three times as Emir and Grand Sharif of Mecca: First in 1827, then 1851 to 1856, and finally 1880 to 1881.

1790 births
1886 deaths
19th-century Arabs
 
Dhawu Zayd